The Luzon Cordillera forest mouse (Apomys abrae) is a species of rodent in the family Muridae found only in the Philippines.

References

Rats of Asia
Apomys
Endemic fauna of the Philippines
Fauna of Luzon
Rodents of the Philippines
Mammals described in 1952
Taxonomy articles created by Polbot
Taxa named by Colin Campbell Sanborn